Hakim Mohammad Nasir (1947 – 28 July 2007) was a Pakistani poet who was widely known for his ghazal song Jab sey tu nay mujhey deewana bana rakha hai sung by Abida Parveen.

Early life and career
Hakim Nasir was born in Ajmer, Rajasthan, British India in 1947. His immediate family and parents migrated to Karachi, Pakistan after 1947. To make a living, the parents set up an herbal medicine business called Nizami Dawakhana on Burnes Road in Karachi. This business was inherited by Hakim Nasir who ran it after their death.
Hakeem Nasir Ahmed(Late), who was brought up and started his study from Ayurvedic and Unani Tibbia College Delhi joined his family traditions and became Herbalist he was also Addressee, He has that Grace and Applicably personality He also served Presidency in Jamiat-ul-Ulama Hind. And his closeness to Dr. Allama Muhammad Iqbal was so much that Allama Iqbal used to share and get reviewed his many writings with Hakeem Nasir Ahmed (Late).
After completion of his studies and practice in Hikmat, he came back to his father in Ajmer and under supervision of his father he learns a lot to serve his family and continue doing his Religious and Worldly works and also serve his people being in many High ranked positions in Government Departments, Also he was connected to “Unani Tareeqa of Khawaja Dargah” and His Grace and Calmness got him successful in Hindustan, After separation of Hindustan he came to Karachi and started Herbal Clinic named “ Nizami Dawakhana” in 1947 with his restless, and continuous practice he served thousands of those Patients and still, his brother Hakim Muhammad Jalal Ahmed and his sons Hakim Muhammad Umer, Hakim Muhammad Abdul Rehman, and Hakim Muhammad Abdullah are doing efforts for the sake of humanity.

Death and legacy
Hakim Nasir had suffered brain hemorrhage two days before his death on Saturday, 28 July 2007. He died at the age of 60.

Siblings
Hakeem Muhammad Taqi’uddin Ahmed (Late), Hakeem Muhammad Kamaluddin Ahmed (Late), Hakeem Muhammad Jalaluddin Ahmed and 6 Sisters

References

External links
Hakim Nasir's ghazal song on YouTube
Nizami Dawakhana on Facebook

1947 births
2007 deaths
Pakistani poets
Urdu-language poets from Pakistan